Elections to Rochdale Council were held on 2 May 2002.  One third of the council was up for election and the Labour Party kept overall control of the council.

After the election, the composition of the council was:
Labour 31
Liberal Democrat 21
Conservative 8

Election result

Ward results

External links
BBC report of 2002 Rochdale election result

2002
2002 English local elections
2000s in Greater Manchester